The National Academy of the History of Venezuela is an institution dedicated to the study and promotion of the history of Venezuela. Specifically, the objective is the collection of bibliographic, newspaper, audiovisual or other documentation to look at the political, economic and social events that have taken place in the country.

History 
The creation of the academy was decreed by the ex-president Juan Pablo Rojas Paúl on October 28, 1888. Its express mission is the study of the history of Venezuela, the Americas and the world with direct relevance to the Venezuelan context. It also deals with the promotion of research in the teaching of history, while at the same time strengthening the Venezuelan identity, all through publishing, audiovisuals and events of various kinds.

Its headquarters are located in the Palace of the Academies on Universidad de Caracas Avenue, between the corners of San Francisco and La Bolsa. In its facilities, it houses its library, which originally contained bibliographic copies, other documents and audiovisual sources. Since 1889 the Individuals of Number who were part of the academy also functioned as the institution's librarians and archivists. Over time, the number of materials increased in such a way that it was necessary to organize these resources into three separate departments: the library itself, the archive and the newspaper and periodical library. In 1961 it was decided to open its three branches to the general public.

These archives were transferred to the academy between 1929 and 1950 after being acquired by the Venezuelan Government. There are also the archives of  Simón Bolívar, composed of correspondence, proclamations, personal and military documents, decrees and notes on Latin American societies written by the Liberator. These are kept in a separate annex of the Academy that is located in the Traposos Corner, on the same avenue. Both compilations have been included in UNESCO's Memory of the World Program.

On June 5, 1940, the first woman joined the academy: Lucila Luciani de Pérez Díaz. Her speech was inspired by General Francisco de Miranda, expressing the equality of women in social, cultural and official aspects. The welcome speech was given by Dr. Juan José Mendoza.

Individuals by number (Individuos de número) 
Until 2015, they were titled Academics of Number. By order of induction, since 1960:

Corresponding members 

  (1890–1971; corresponding member in Mexico; inducted 1966)

See also 

 Venezuelan Academy of Language

References

External links 

 National Academy of History – Venezuela — Official Web site.

National academies